File 770 is a long-running science fiction fanzine, newszine, and blog site published/administered by Mike Glyer. It has been published every year since 1978, and has won a record eight Hugo Awards for  Best Fanzine, with the first win in 1984 and the most recent in 2018.

History
File 770 is named after the legendary room party held in Room 770 at Nolacon, the 9th World Science Fiction Convention in New Orleans, Louisiana, that upstaged the other events at the 1951 Worldcon.
Glyer started File 770 in 1978 as a mimeographed print fanzine to report on fan clubs, conventions, fannish projects, fans, fanzines and SF awards, with articles written in a "no-nonsense style". In the 1990s, Glyer moved production of the fanzine to computer desktop publishing, and on January 15, 2008, he began publishing File 770 as a blog on the internet. 

A print version of File 770 has been produced every year from 1978 to the present. eFanzines.com began hosting PDF versions of the paper issues in 2005. While File 770 remains a traditional paper fanzine published once or twice a year, much additional news and expanded content is available daily in its online blog site version edited by Glyer.

Awards
File 770 has won the Hugo Award for Best Fanzine eight times, in 1984, 1985, 1989, 2000, 2001, 2008, 2016, and 2018. It has received a total of thirty-one nominations over four decades, as shown in the following table. Glyer himself has also won the Hugo Award for Best Fan Writer four times for his work on File 770. Writing in The Encyclopedia of Science Fiction, Rob Hansen and David Langford described the zine as evoking a strong feeling of community.
 

In his 2018 Hugo acceptance speech, Glyer recused himself and File 770 from future nominations. The next year, File 770 received enough votes to qualify for the Hugo ballot; it was not listed due to the recusal.

Notes

References

External links
File 770 at eFanzines

Magazines established in 1978
Science fiction fanzines
Hugo Award-winning works
Magazines published in Louisiana
Science fiction websites
Science fiction webzines